The murder of Gabriel Cruz, also known as Operación Nemo, refers to the events related to the disappearance of Gabriel Cruz Ramírez, aged 8, on the afternoon of 27 February 2018 in Almería, Andalusia, Spain.

Cruz disappeared while travelling from his grandmother's residence to his cousins', only 100 metres away, and remained missing for twelve days. A search and rescue operation consisting of over 5,000 people, including 3,000 volunteers and 2,000 professionals, was established. It was the largest coordinated search for a missing person in Spanish history.

On 11 March 2018, Cruz' body was found in the boot of a vehicle belonging to Ana Julia Quezada, who was the father's partner at the time. Quezada had allegedly killed and buried Cruz on a farm owned by his father's family in the town of Rodalquilar, and had dug up and transported the body to her home in La Puebla de Vícar when she was detained by the Civil Guard. She confessed to the crime two days later.

The investigation remains open and pending on legal ruling.

Context 
In February 2018, Gabriel Cruz was living with his grandmother in the town of Las Hortichuelas, located in the heart of the Cabo de Gata-Níjar Natural Park in Almería, Andalusia, Spain. On Tuesday 27 February, at 3.30pm, Cruz left his grandmother's house to go play at his cousins' house, which was located 100 metres away. Walking to his cousins' house required travelling through an unpaved dirt road and crossing the main street, but Cruz disappeared before reaching his destination. When Cruz failed to return at 6.00 pm, his grandmother went to the relatives' house and discovered he had never visited. Neighbours started to look for Cruz as his parents, who were not in town at the time, were alerted; they quickly joined in the search for their son. Five hours later, at 8.30 pm, Cruz' family contacted police.

Almost one week later, a white T-shirt was found about four kilometres from the place where Cruz was last seen. Minister of Home Affairs Juan Ignacio Zoido confirmed that the analyses carried out by the forensics laboratory of the Civil Guard found traces of Cruz' DNA on the shirt. Investigators would later determine that the discovery of the shirt was feigned by Cruz' alleged murderer. The fact that the clothing was almost dry when discovered in spite of previous rain was deemed a clue.

On Friday 9 March 2018, Spanish media reported that two people claimed to have seen a van lurking around the area where Cruz' track was lost. Only two days later, Cruz' body was located inside another vehicle — one owned by Ana Julia Quezada, his father’s girlfriend.

Search operation 
While Cruz had disappeared somewhere along the short distance between his grandmother’s house and his cousins’, the Civil Guard spread their search area over six kilometres from the starting point, and then up to twelve kilometres around specific areas such as wells, old mines or uninhabited houses. The agents focused on Las Negras waterworks, near the place where Quezada pretended to find Cruz' T-shirt. A specialised team of divers searched for the child at more than 500 points, including wells and cisterns. The investigation was impeded by the lack of road or security cameras in Las Hortichuelas, where there are hardly any businesses that would require them.

Alleged perpetrator 
Ana Julia Quezada, the alleged perpetrator of Cruz' murder, was the romantic partner of his father, Ángel David Cruz. Originally from the Dominican Republic, Quezada emigrated to Spain with her daughter, Ridelca Josefina Gil Quezada, in 1995. The following year Ridelca, aged 4, fell through a seventh-floor window at her mother's residence in Burgos. The incident was ruled an accidental death, but authorities announced that it would be reinvestigated after Cruz' murder.

Although she initially stated that she was not guilty, Quezada finally confessed the crime two days later. She was charged with murder, kidnapping and crimes against moral integrity.

During her first court appearance, Quezada repeated the declaration made before the Civil Guard, in which she admitted to fatally suffocating Cruz following an argument. She then allegedly hid his body in the family's cottage in Rodalquilar, where the child had been taken after being kidnapped. This version was partially discredited by the investigators in their official account of the facts, in which it is quoted:
The defendant murdered Gabriel herself, without any other person; she took the child possibly because of the jealousy she had for him; she killed him the day of his abduction, suffocating him, and buried him by covering him with decorative stones and planks.

As the Lieutenant Colonel, Accidental Chief of the Civil Guard Command of Almeria, José Hernández Mosquera, stated a posteriori, Ana Julia was suspected practically from the beginning of the investigation. Even so, the agents always believed she had Gabriel alive and their goal was to get her to take them to the little boy. But Gabriel was killed the same day he disappeared, as the autopsy confirmed.

On March 3, an essential event occurred that would later help to solve the case: Ana Julia staged the appearance of the t-shirt worn by the minor; she said she found it about four kilometres far from Las Hortichuelas. To do this, she had to go through a piece of land, arrive in Las Negras and enter a gully, something that was quite implausible for the researchers. It is worth mentioning that she was the one who told Angel to go and look around the area, and it was her who found the t-shirt. Angel was nearby but not in sight at the time of the alleged discovery. The family recognized it as Gabriel's shirt.

According to the Civil Guard, the T-shirt was a sign that the defendant wanted to do to his partner in time so as to give him hope. Near the place where the child was found lived Ana Julia’s former partner and, in all likelihood, she thought that researchers would direct their inquests towards that person, but it proved to be unsuccessful. 

On March 11, Ana Julia went to Rodalquiar house, while she was under close surveillance. The officers saw her pulling some planks, some stones out the garden, as well as a body that apparently belonged to a small person who fit Gabriel’s profile. She put it in the trunk and left for Almería; she passed through Almería and arrived in Vícar. It was then that the research team decided to arrest her when she got out of the car, looking in the trunk and finding Gabriel’s body wrapped in a blanket. Apparently, the body was in good condition, and the child was half-naked, wearing only underwear.

While she was in jail, the prisoner statement was taken and she confess in front of her lawyer that she was responsible for the killing, giving some details such as the fact that she had thrown Gabriel’s clothes in a glass container in the Spanish town Retamar. The agents examined the area and found them, except for the T-shirt.

The murderer's relationship with Angel and Gabriel's family 
Ana Julia actively participated in Gabriel's search and she seemed sad for what had happened. She even talked to the media, cried, feigned and comforted her partner. The Civil Guard revealed that she was giving Angel large Diazepam doses, an anxiolytic, to calm him down and make him forget about what had happened. She had also tried to persuade him to go to Dominican Republic for weeks, but he refused. “Don't worry, Angel. When we find Gabrielito and once this is over, we’ll get married”, she told him repeatedly.

Impact 
Gabriel Cruz’s case shocked the Spanish society. Two days before the body was found, an important demonstration took place in Almería to claim the child’s return. His parents said that Gabriel loved fish, that he liked drawing them and that he wanted to become a marine biologist. Since then, the symbol of a small fish filled windows, schools, public centres and social networks all over the country so as to support them.

See also
List of solved missing person cases
Anna and Olivia case

References

External links 
 "Así fue la 'Operación Nemo' que acabó con la detención de Ana Julia": an article from the Spanish newspaper El Mundo.

2010s missing person cases
2018 in Spain
Incidents of violence against boys
Missing person cases in Spain
Scandals in Spain
Trials in Spain